Lupinus mutabilis is a species of lupin grown in the Andes, mainly for its edible bean.  Vernacular names include tarwi (in Quechua II, pronounced tarhui), chocho, altramuz, Andean lupin, South American lupin, Peruvian field lupin, and pearl lupin. Its nutrient-rich seeds are high in protein, as well as a good source for cooking oil. However, their bitter taste has made L. mutabilis relatively unknown outside the Andes, though modern technology makes it easier to remove the bitter alkaloids. Like other species of lupin beans, it is expanding in use as a plant-based protein source.

Origin and Dissemination 

The origin of L. mutabilis has been identified in the Andean region of Ecuador, Peru and Bolivia. In this area, the greatest genetic variability in the world was found. The plant has been domesticated for more than 1500 years, mostly because of its high protein content.

Biology 

L. mutabilis is an annual plant. The stem is hollow and highly branched. Due to the high vegetative growth, species from northern South America are taller than species from the southern Andean region. The genome contains 2n = 48 chromosomes and there is a high genomic variation, which leads to big differences in morphology. Several architectural types of L. mutabilis exist. Most common is the branching in V-form, this type has the highest biomass production. The basal branching type has the positive feature that its infructescence is at the same level. This species is preferably promoted because of its early ripening, stability and the homogeny seed quality.

Morphology 

One pod contains on average 2–3 seeds, but can have up to 9 seeds per pod. The thousand-seed weight (TSW) is around 200 g. Leaves are palmate and have a typical appearance: one leaf is divided in five to twelve leaflets, which have an oval or lanceolate form. The form is typical for Faboideaes. The corolla reaches  and contains five petals. Variation in coloration is high and reaches from white to purple. The white coloration is recessive to purple. L. mutabilis has a strong taproot reaching  length. Like all Leguminosae secondary roots build nodules containing bacteria for nitrogen fixation.

Development 

The growing cycle varies from 150 to 360 days, depending on the genotype, altitude and environmental conditions. Phenological phases are: emergence, first true leaf, formation of the raceme on the central stem, flowering, podding, pod ripening, and physiological maturity.

Use

Human consumption 

The bone-white seed contains more than 40% protein and 20% fat and has been used as a food by Andean people since ancient times, especially in soups, stews, salads and by itself mixed with boiled maize. Like other legumes, its protein is rich in the essential amino acid lysine.  The distribution of essential fatty acids is about 28% linoleic acid (omega-6) and 2% linolenic acid (omega-3). It has a soft seed coat that makes for easy cooking. It may not have been more widely used because of its bitter taste, due to the alkaloid content. It contains unusually high amounts of sparteine, which make up nearly half of its alkaloid content. However, the alkaloids are water-soluble and can be removed by soaking the seeds for some days in water. QAs are heat-stable toxins; cooking alone does not remove the alkaloids. Like other species of lupin beans, chocho beans are expanding in use as a plant-based protein source in the world marketplace.

Compounds 

L. mutabilis contains 42% of protein and 18% fat in average. The high fat content has allowed commercial oil pressing. The protein digestibility and nutritional value are reportedly similar to those in soybeans.

Contents in the seed:

As with all Lupinus spp., L. mutabilis produces compounds called  (BLADs). Also as with the rest of the genus it produces oligomers called BLAD-containing oligomers (BCOs). BCOs have a fungicidal action with multiple MoAs.

Wild populations of L. mutabilis contain toxic, bitter quinolizidine alkaloids. Cultivars also contain QAs but in much lower levels thanks to breeding programs begun in Germany in the 1930s.

Green manure and soil improver 

L. mutabilis is able to fix nitrogen from the air. Incorporation in the flowering stage leads to a higher quantity of organic matter and to an improved soil structure.

Agricultural aspects

Soil and climate requirements 

L. mutabilis is a crop for cool climates and exists mainly in valleys at high altitudes, such as the Andes at tropical latitudes. The crop withstands exceptional levels of drought. Mature plants are resistant to frost, whereas seedlings are sensitive to low temperatures.

Cultivation technique 

Sowing

In traditional farming practices minimum tilling is done before sowing.  of unselected seeds is sown.

Improved cultivation practices:

Plants germinate fast due to the high fat content in the seeds.

Crop rotation aspects

Early varieties of L. mutabilis, with a growing period of about 150 days, can be cultivated in rotation with potatoes and cereals. Nematode disease of potato can be controlled by alkaloids when cultivated after L. mutabilis.

Harvest

In traditional farming practices harvest occurs when plants have reached full maturity and the water content of seeds is between 8-12%.

Disease control

Alkaloids can act as a pesticide but breeding goals aim for a low alkaloid content. Therefore, other disease control methods must be applied. Since L. mutabilis is a low-input crop, disease control mainly is done by phytosanitary methods. A reduction of soil born saprophytes can be reached by removing dry straw from the field. Instead of green manure the plant residues can be used as fuel. Seed borne diseases can be reduced by translocation of seed production and by the use of certificated seed.
If seed production is done by the cultivator, diseases can be controlled by reducing the number of infected seed and by a permanent control of diseases in the field. Another possibility is to treat seed with a fungicide prior to sowing.

Breeding goals 

Since species with low alkaloid content are already available a further step would be to make them more stable and low alkaloid content is inherited. Other breeding goals are tolerance to diseases and insects, improvement in yield, early maturing and synchronous ripening. Higher resistance could be reached by breeding a variety with high alkaloid content in leaves but not in the seeds.

References

External links 

 The ancient Ecuadorean legume being hailed as a new superfood – BBC
 Plants for a Future
 Lupins - geography, classification, genetic resources
 'From the Andes: First Potato, Then Quinoa, Now Tarwi?' in The Natural Farmer, Fall 2004 (p. 40)
 'Tarwi' chapter, in "Lost Crops of the Incas"

mutabilis
Flora of the Andes
Flora of Bolivia
Flora of Ecuador
Flora of Peru
Crops originating from South America
Crops originating from Ecuador
Crops originating from Peru
Peruvian cuisine